No Fear is an American lifestyle clothing brand. 

No Fear may also refer to:

Music
"No Fear" (Dej Loaf song), 2017
"No Fear" (The Rasmus song), 2005
"No Fear" (Terri Clark song), 2000
"No Fear", a song by Agnostic Front from Something's Gotta Give, 1998
"No Fear", a song by Greyson Chance from Somewhere Over My Head, 2016
"No Fear", a song by O.G.C. from Da Storm, 1996
"No Fear", a song by Saara Aalto competing to represent Finland in the Eurovision Song Contest 2016
"No Fear", a song from the Swan Princess film soundtrack, 1994
No Fear, a 2019 album by Beenie Gunter

Other uses
No-FEAR Act, a United States federal anti-discrimination law
No Fear (professional wrestling), a tag team that consisted of Takao Omori and Yoshihiro Takayama
No Fear: Dangerous Sports, a 1995 pinball machine
No Fear Racing, a part-time NASCAR Sprint Cup Series team

See also